The 2016 Latin American Table Tennis Championships were held in San Juan, Puerto Rico from February 1 to February 7, 2016.

Medal summary

Events

Medal table

Results

Men's singles

Finals

Top Draw

Bottom Draw

Women's singles

Finals

Top Draw

Bottom Draw

Men's doubles

Finals

Top Draw

Bottom Draw

Women's doubles

Finals

Top Draw

Bottom Draw

Mixed doubles

Finals

Preliminary

Top Draw

Bottom Draw

Men's team

Group A

Group B

Group C

Group D

Women's team

Group A

Group B

Group C

See also
2016 ITTF World Tour

References

External links

ITTF.com

Latin American Table Tennis Championships
Latin American Table Tennis Championships